George Spiro Dibie (November 15, 1931 – February 8, 2022) was an American cinematographer. He was nominated for Emmy Awards 12 times. He won an Emmy in 1985 for Mr. Belvedere, in 1987 and 1991 for Growing Pains, in 1990 for Just the Ten of Us, and in 1995 for Sister, Sister. He died on February 8, 2022, at the age of 90.

References

External links

George Spiro Dibie at Find a Grave

1931 births
2022 deaths
American cinematographers
American producers
Burials at Hollywood Forever Cemetery